Matthew Broderick (born March 21, 1962) is an American actor. His roles include the Golden Globe-nominated portrayal of the title character in Ferris Bueller's Day Off (1986), the voice of adult Simba in Disney's The Lion King (1994), and Leo Bloom in both the Broadway musical The Producers and its 2005 film adaptation. Other films he had starring credits in include WarGames (1983), Glory (1989), The Freshman (1990), The Cable Guy (1996), Godzilla (1998), Inspector Gadget (1999), You Can Count on Me (2000) and The Last Shot (2004). Broderick also directed himself in Infinity (1996) and provided voice work in Good Boy! (2003), Bee Movie (2007), and The Tale of Despereaux (2008).

Broderick has won two Tony Awards, one for Best Featured Actor in a Play for Brighton Beach Memoirs (1983), and one for Best Actor in a Musical for How to Succeed in Business Without Really Trying (1995). In 2001, Broderick starred in Mel Brooks' musical comedy The Producers alongside Nathan Lane. He later reunited with Lane in the Broadway revival of Terrence McNally's showbiz comedy It's Only a Play (2014). In 2013, Broderick starred in the Broadway musical Nice Work If You Can Get It where he went on to receive a nomination for the Grammy Award for Best Musical Theater Album. , Broderick remains the youngest winner of the Tony Award for Best Featured Actor in a Play.

In 2006, for his contributions to the film industry, Broderick was inducted into the Hollywood Walk of Fame with a motion pictures star located at 6801 Hollywood Boulevard. Eleven years later, he earned induction into the American Theater Hall of Fame.

Early life
Broderick was born in Manhattan, the son of Patricia ( Biow), a playwright, actress, and painter, and James Broderick, an actor and World War II veteran. His mother was Ashkenazi Jewish, a descendant of emigrants from Germany and Poland. His father was a Catholic of Irish and English descent. Broderick attended grade school at City and Country School in Manhattan and high school at the private Walden School, also in Manhattan. He received acting training at HB Studio.

Career

Broderick's first major acting role came in an HB Studio workshop production of playwright Horton Foote's On Valentine's Day, playing opposite his father, who was a friend of Foote's. This was followed by a supporting role as Harvey Fierstein's gay adopted son, David, in the off-Broadway production of Fierstein's Torch Song Trilogy; then, a good review by The New York Times theater critic Mel Gussow brought him to the attention of Broadway. Broderick commented on the effects of that review in a 2004 60 Minutes II interview:

Before I knew it, I was like this guy in a hot play. And suddenly, all these doors opened. And it's only because Mel Gussow happened to come by right before it closed and happened to like it. It's just amazing. All these things have to line up that are out of your control.

He followed that with the role of Eugene Morris Jerome in the Neil Simon Eugene Trilogy including the plays Brighton Beach Memoirs and Biloxi Blues. He won the Tony Award for Best Featured Actor in a Play for his role in Brighton Beach Memoirs.

His first film role as Michael McPhee in 1983's Max Dugan Returns was also written by Neil Simon, but his first big hit film was WarGames, a summer hit in 1983, in which he played the main role of Seattle teen hacker David Lightman. Broderick next played Philippe Gaston in Ladyhawke, in 1985.

Broderick then won the role of the charming, clever slacker in the 1986 film Ferris Bueller's Day Off. At the age of 23, Broderick played the titular high school student who, with his girlfriend and best friend, plays hooky and explores Chicago. A 1980s comedy favorite, the film is one of Broderick's best-known roles (particularly with teenage audiences). Also in 1987, he played Air Force research assistant Jimmy Garrett in Project X. In 1988, Broderick played Harvey Fierstein's lover, Alan, in the screen adaptation of Torch Song Trilogy.

He starred in the 1989 film Glory alongside Cary Elwes, Morgan Freeman, and Denzel Washington, where he received favorable reviews for his portrayal of the American Civil War officer Robert Gould Shaw, whom Broderick physically resembled.

In the 1990s, Broderick was the voice of adult Simba in Disney's successful animated film The Lion King, and he also voiced Tack the Cobbler in Miramax's controversial version of The Thief and the Cobbler, which had originally been intended as a silent role. He won recognition for two dark comedy roles: bachelor Steven Kovacs in 1996's The Cable Guy with Jim Carrey, and a high school teacher in Alexander Payne's 1999 film Election with Reese Witherspoon.

Broderick returned to Broadway as a musical star in the 1990s, winning a Tony Award for his performance in How to Succeed in Business Without Really Trying. Broderick then starred alongside Nathan Lane in the Mel Brooks 2001 stage version of The Producers which was a critical and financial success. He played Leopold "Leo" Bloom, an accountant who co-produces a musical designed to fail that turns out to be successful. Broderick was nominated for another Tony Award but lost to his co-star Nathan Lane. The musical went on to win the most Tony Awards in history with 12 wins. Broderick and Lane reprised their roles in the 2005 film adaptation of the same name.

Broderick starred in a 2004 off-Broadway production of the award-winning Larry Shue play The Foreigner as the witty Charlie Baker. He was reunited with his co-star from The Lion King and The Producers, Nathan Lane, in The Odd Couple, which opened on Broadway in October 2005. He appeared on Broadway as a college professor in The Philanthropist, running April 10 through June 28, 2009. He returned to the Broadway stage in Spring 2012 to star in the musical Nice Work If You Can Get It, directed and choreographed by Kathleen Marshall. He notably starred in the 2015 Broadway adaptation of Sylvia, a play by A.R. Gurney directed by Daniel J. Sullivan.

Broderick made his West End debut in The Starry Messenger in May 2019, co-starring with Elizabeth McGovern.

In 2018, it was announced that Broderick was cast in the main role of Michael Burr in the Netflix comedy-drama series Daybreak.

In 2022, Broderick returned to Broadway in a revival of Plaza Suite where he starred alongside his wife Sarah Jessica Parker.

Personal life

Family

Broderick and actress Sarah Jessica Parker married on May 19, 1997, in an Episcopal ceremony officiated by his sister, Janet Broderick Kraft.

Parker and Broderick have a son, and twin daughters via surrogacy.

Although the couple live in the West Village, they spend a large amount of time at their second home in Kilcar, a village in County Donegal, Ireland, where Broderick spent his summers as a child. They also have a house in The Hamptons.

Broderick is a political liberal.

Ancestry
In March 2010, Broderick was featured in the NBC program Who Do You Think You Are? Broderick stated that his participation in the ancestry research program emotionally reconnected him with the role he played in Glory 22 years earlier, as he discovered his paternal great-great-grandfather, Robert Martindale, was a Union soldier. A veteran of the Battle of Gettysburg, Martindale, who belonged to the 20th Connecticut, was killed in the aftermath of the Battle of Atlanta and was eventually interred in an unnamed grave at the Marietta National Cemetery. Having identified the grave with the help of historian Brad Quinlin, Broderick's research enabled him to give his ancestor his name back. In the same program, Broderick discovered that his paternal grandfather, James Joseph Broderick II, whom he had never known, was a highly decorated combat medic in World War I, having earned his distinctions during the Meuse-Argonne Offensive.

1987 car crash
On August 5, 1987, while driving a rented BMW 316 on the Tempo Road outside Tempo, Northern Ireland, Broderick crossed into the wrong lane and collided head-on with a Volvo. The driver, Anna Gallagher, 28, and her mother, Margaret Doherty, 63, were both killed instantly. He was vacationing with Jennifer Grey, whom he had begun dating in semi-secrecy during the filming of Ferris Bueller's Day Off; the crash publicly revealed their relationship. He suffered a fractured leg and ribs, a concussion, and a collapsed lung. Grey's injuries included severe whiplash, which later required surgery to avoid paralysis.

Broderick told police he had no recollection of the crash and did not know why he had been in the wrong lane: "What I first remember is waking up in the hospital, with a very strange feeling going on in my leg." He was charged with causing death by dangerous driving and faced up to five years in prison, but was convicted of the lesser charge of careless driving and fined £100 (US$175).

The victims' family called the verdict "a travesty of justice". The victims' brother and son, Martin Doherty, later forgave Broderick amid plans to meet him in 2003. In February 2012, when Broderick was featured in a multi-million-dollar Honda commercial that aired during the Super Bowl, Doherty said the meeting had still not taken place and that Broderick "wasn't the greatest choice of drivers, knowing his past".

Filmography

Film

Television

Theatre

Awards and nominations 

Other awards

References

External links

 
 
 
 
 
 
 
 
 
 2004 Story from 60 Minutes II
 Matthew Broderick interview in 1986 about Ferris Bueller's Day Off from the Texas Archive of the Moving Image

1962 births
20th-century American male actors
20th-century American Jews
20th-century American criminals
21st-century American male actors
21st-century American Jews
American male comedians
American male criminals
Comedians from New York City
American male film actors
American male musical theatre actors
American male singers
American male stage actors
American male voice actors
American people of English descent
American people of German-Jewish descent
American people of Irish descent
American people of Polish-Jewish descent
Biow family
Criminals from New York City
Jewish American male actors
Living people
Male actors from New York City
Obie Award recipients
People from Greenwich Village
Tony Award winners
Walden School (New York City) alumni
Members of The Lambs Club